Alexei Tsvetkov (born August 28, 1981) is a Russian professional ice hockey forward who is currently an unrestricted free agent.

Career 
Tsvetkov most recently played for HC Sochi in the Kontinental Hockey League (KHL). He previously played four seasons for HC Dynamo Moscow of the KHL. Tsvetkov joined Sochi as a free agent, signing a one-year deal on July 12, 2017.

References

External links

1981 births
Living people
HC Dynamo Moscow players
HC MVD players
Severstal Cherepovets players
SKA Saint Petersburg players
HC Sochi players
Russian ice hockey centres